The Dodge Matador is a full-sized automobile which was produced for the 1960 model year by Dodge. The Matador was the base model, positioned below the top trim level Dodge Polara that also used the  wheelbase platform of the Chrysler Windsor and Chrysler Newport models.

Design
The Matador, was one of two new models produced by Dodge in 1960 when the marque dropped its long-running Coronet, Custom, Custom Royal, and Lancer models. Sharing the same newly engineered unibody platform as the slightly smaller Dodge Dart, the Matador was designated Dodge's full-size base trim vehicle, with the Dodge Polara becoming the make's full-sized premium model. The Matador line was positioned as a lower priced option to the Polara line to serve as the base-level, full-size car to above the newly introduced and successful  wheelbase Dart series. However, full-sized cars in the U.S. market were at their lowest sales level since the end of World War II, and 1959 was not the best time to launch a new nameplate into the full-size segment for the 1960 model year.

The 1960 Matador and Polara were built on  longer wheelbase along with the 1960 DeSoto and Chrysler models. All Matadors featured a standard "Super Red Ram"   V8 engine. The "D-500 with Ram Induction"  with dual four-barrel carburetors was optional, along with a three-speed TorqueFlite automatic transmission. Similarly to other contemporary Chrysler automobiles, the automatic transmission was controlled by mechanical pushbuttons on the left side of the instrument panel.

The Matador (and the similar, better-trimmed Polara) featured styling cues that were carried over from 1959 models, themselves an evolution of Virgil Exner's "Forward Look" cars introduced in 1957. Exner was responsible for some of the most memorable cars during the tailfin era. The 1960 Dodge version has been described as a "rocket age design." Now built on a new unibody chassis, the 1960 Matador continued the Dodge styling hallmarks of stacked "jet pod" taillights; however, the size of the lights was greatly exaggerated, with the lower light set into the rear bumper. The design also incorporated Dodge’s shortened tailfins that included small vertical taillight lenses placed on the vertical surface at the back of the fin; again. The purpose of the shortened fin was meant to exaggerate the length of the “jet pods” holding the taillights. The front end featured a small grille comprising six stacks of aluminum rectangles nested in a massive (and complex) front bumper assembly. 

The interior featured cloth and vinyl bench seats with premium trim and an "X-within-an-X four-spoke steering wheel." The dashboard was "space-age-styled" featuring a bridged-over sweep-style speedometer on top flanked by gauge pods and a "revolving turret clock" centered on the instrument panel. 

All 1960 Dodge station wagons used the  wheelbase providing  of cargo space with the back seats folded flat. The Matador trim was available in six- or nine-passenger (with a rear-facing third row bench seat) versions both featuring a roll-down rear window into the tailgate.

The Matador had less exterior chrome trim and plainer interiors than found on the Polara. The majority of cars built by Dodge and sold during the 1960 model year were in Dodge's new "smaller" and less expensive full-sized model, the Dodge Dart, which fielded three sub-series (Seneca, Pioneer, and Phoenix) of its own.

A total of 27,908 Dodge Matadors were produced for 1960. Low sales volume of the Matador, the continuing popularity of the Dart models, and the launch of the compact Lancer meant the Matador nameplate was dropped for the 1961 model year leaving only the Polara as the full-size Dodge.

Legacy
Chrysler purchased American Motors Corporation (AMC) in 1987. The Matador nameplate was used by AMC from 1971 until 1978 for its mid- and full-sized AMC Matador cars.

References

External links
 

Matador
Full-size vehicles
Rear-wheel-drive vehicles
Coupés
Sedans
Station wagons
Cars introduced in 1960